Rollout or roll 'em out is poker jargon used for a game phase in certain poker variants. It is often incorrectly called "roll your own", to which it has similarities but from which it is fundamentally different.

Poker games with a rollout phase resemble stud poker but have significantly different strategies, because players generally receive all of their cards up front (sometimes with a draw phase), and know the final value of their hand in early betting rounds. They resemble stud poker only in that cards are revealed to other players one at a time for each betting round.

There are the same three variations on the idea as with roll your own, depending on when players are allowed to choose which card to reveal. They can either be forced to arrange the order of their cards before any betting begins ("choose before"), or they can also be allowed to choose cards in later rounds based on information found in earlier rounds ("choose after"). In the latter case, the revealing can be made simultaneously or in turn.

In the game of show five, for example, each player is dealt seven cards before any betting begins, and each of the game's five betting rounds begins with the players simultaneously revealing one of their cards ("simultaneous choose-after rollout").  Rollout games are frequently played high-low split, and players choose which cards to reveal in order to delay as long as possible revealing which half of the pot they intend to win.

Poker gameplay and terminology
Poker variants